Abdul Hamid Khan Bhashani (12 December 1880 – 17 November 1976), often shortened as Maulana Bhashani, was a Bengali politician. His political tenure spanned the British colonial India, Pakistan and Bangladesh periods.

Maulana Bhashani was popularly known by the honorary title Mozlum Jananeta (Leader of the Oppressed) for his lifelong stance advocating for the poor. He gained nationwide mass popularity among the peasants and helped to build the East Pakistan Peasant Association. Owing to his political leaning to the left, often dubbed Islamic Socialism, he was also called 'The Red Maulana'.

An alumnus of Darul Uloom Deoband, and participant in the Khilafat Movement protesting the dissolution of the Ottoman Empire, he led the Muslims of Assam in a successful campaign during the 1947 Sylhet Referendum, through which Sylhet chose to become part of the Pakistan national project. He was the founder and President of the Pakistan Awami Muslim League (AML) which later became the Awami League (AL). Later however, owing to differences with the right-leaning leaders in the AML, such as Shaheed Suhrawardy, on the issue of autonomy for East Pakistan, he formed a new progressive party called the National Awami Party (NAP). Bhashani also differed with Suhrawardy when the latter, as Prime Minister of Pakistan, decided to join the US-led defence pacts CENTO and SEATO. He disagreed with Pakistan's growing ties with the United States.

The split of the left-wing camp into pro-Moscow and pro-Beijing factions eventually led to the break-up of NAP into two separate parties; the pro-Moscow faction being led by Muzaffar Ahmed. After Pakistan's 1965 war with India, he showed some support for Field Marshal Ayub Khan's regime for its China-leaning foreign policy; but later he provided leadership to a mass uprising against the regime in 1968–69 with support from Fatima Jinnah.

American journalist Dan Coggin, writing for Time, credited Bhashani, "as much as any one man", for instigating the 1969 Mass uprising in East Pakistan that culminated in the collapse of the Ayub Khan regime and the release of Sheikh Mujibur Rahman and the others accused in the Agartala conspiracy case. According to lay author S. Akhtar Ehtisham, Bhashani's decision to boycott the 1970 Pakistan general elections effectively led to the electoral landslide by his erstwhile opponent Mujibur Rahman. The Awami League, without any viable opposition in East Pakistan, won 160 of the 162 seats in the province and thus gained a majority in the Pakistan national assembly.

Early life
Abdul Hamid Khan Bhashani was born in Dhangara village in Sirajganj, Bengal Presidency in 1880.  He was the son of Sharafat Ali Khan. Between 1907 and 1909 he received a religious education at the Darul Uloom Deoband. His association with Mahmud Hasan Deobandi and other progressive Islamic thinkers inspired Bhashani to oppose British imperialism. In 1909 he started teaching in a primary school at Kagmaree, Tangail.

Political career

British period
In 1917, Bhashani became politically active and joined the Nationalist party led by Chittaranjan Das as an activist. Inspired by Mohammad Ali Jauhar, he joined the Indian National Congress in 1919. In 1920 he was arrested and imprisoned. After being released, he participated in the Khilafat movement. In 1921 he participated in Das's Non-Cooperation Movement against British imperialism. He suffered imprisonment for some days at that time along with his large numbers of followers. He joined the Muslim League in 1930. He was elected a MLA in Assam Legislative Assembly for the Dhubri (South) constituency in 1937 and served until 1946. In April 1944 he was elected president of the Muslim League at its Barpeta session and thereafter devoted himself to the Pakistan Movement.

Early Pakistan days
After the establishment of India and Pakistan in 1947, following the exit of the British, Bhashani planned his anti-establishment course of action. On 23 June 1949, he founded East Pakistan Awami Muslim League.  Bhasani was elected its president with Shamsul Huq as its General Secretary. On 24 July 1949 he organised the first meeting of Awami Muslim League at Armanitola, Dhaka, during which Yar Mohammad Khan contributed and finally established the party in Dhaka. 

On 31 January 1952 he formed the "All Party Language Movement Committee" at the Dhaka Bar Library. He campaigned for the recognition of Bangla as a national language in Pakistan. The National Democratic Front was established under his leadership on 4 December 1953. He renamed the Awami Muslim League as the Awami League by removing "Muslim" from its official name in the council session of Awami League held on 21–23 October 1953. 

The Muslim League Government both in the centre and in the province of East Pakistan lost considerable popularity after the Language Movement of 1952. It was seen as not being capable or interested in protecting the interests of East Pakistan. With an election to be held in the province in 1954, a new political party emerged to challenge the Muslim League. It was called the United Front and comprised the party led by Bhashani and the Krishak Sramik Party led by A. K. Fazlul Huq, former Prime Minister of Bengal. The Awami League, under Shahid Suhrawardy also joined the alliance. The United Front won the provincial election in East Pakistan by defeating the Muslim League.

In May 1954 Bhashani went to Stockholm. He was barred from returning to East Pakistan by the government of Iskander Mirza and branded a communist. Between 7 and 23 May 1956, Bhashani went on a hunger strike to demand food for famine affected people.

During the Kagmaree Conference of Awami League held on 7–8 February 1957, Bhashani left the West Pakistani authority which had acted negatively against East Pakistan. On 24–25 July 1957, Bhashani convened the conference of All Pakistan Democratic Activists. On 25 July he formed the East Pakistan National Awami Party (NAP). Bhashani was elected the President with Mahmudul Huq Osmani, as General Secretary.

According to Ehtisham, Bhashani played a crucial role in the opposition decision to nominate Fatima Jinnah as a candidate in the 1965 Pakistani presidential election, instead of Azam Khan. Fatima Jinnah was initially scornful of an opposition attempt to nominate her, however on Bhashani's personal intervention, she agreed to be their joint candidate.

Despite this pledged support for Fatima Jinnah, Bhashani was controversially alleged to have become inactive during the Opposition's Presidential campaign ostensibly because of Ayub Khan's pro-China leanings; Sherbaz Khan Mazari later alleged that Bhashani was bribed by Zulfikar Ali Bhutto.

In 1969 Bhashani launched a movement for the withdrawal of the Agartala Conspiracy Case and the release of Sheikh Mujib. American journalist Dan Coggin, writing for Time, credited Bhashani, "as much as any one man", for instigating the 1969 Mass uprising in East Pakistan that culminated in the collapse of the Ayub Khan regime. In 1970 Bhashani called for the independence of East Pakistan consistent with the 1940 Lahore Resolution. 

Bhashani, with his National Awami party, had organised an International Kisan conference from 23 to 25 March 1970 in Toba Tek Singh District. During the conference he asked the Government of Pakistan to hold a referendum asking the population if they wanted Islamic Socialism. He warned that there might be guerrilla warfare if the military government failed to do so.

War of Independence 1971

Moulana Abdul Hamid Khan Bhashani was the Chairman of Sorbodoliyo Songram Parisad in 1971.  Bhashani asked China to aid Bangladesh in its liberation war. His request was not answered by China.

Career in independent Bangladesh
Following independence, Bhashani wanted to play the role of a responsible opposition. The progressive forces quickly gathered around him and strengthened the NAP with Kazi Zafar Ahmed as its General Secretary. But soon factional differences among the progressive forces emerged and weakened Bhashani's position.

Bhashani was highly critical of the oppressive style of the Awami League and BAKSAL government. He also warned Sheikh Mujibur Rahman against his move towards a one party state and declaring himself as lifelong president. Bhashani was deeply shocked at the killing of Mujib, for whom he had a lot of fatherly affection, and his family members. The person who conveyed the news of Mujib's demise described how Bhashani cried and then went to his prayer room to offer prayer.

In May 1976 he led a massive Long March demanding demolition of the Farakka Barrage constructed by India to divert the flow of the Ganges waters inside its territory, triggering the drying up of river Padma and desertification of Bangladesh.  

At the time, the government of Bangladesh unofficially supported Bhashani's Farakka Long March. Navy Chief Rear Admiral M. H. Khan was in charge of providing logistics. Hundreds of thousands of people from all walks of life from all over the country gathered in Rajshahi to participate in the Long March.

On the morning of 16 March 1976, Bhashani addressed a gathering of people at the Madrash Maidan in Rajshahi, from where the Long March commenced. Hundreds of thousands of people walked more than 100 kilometres on foot for days. The March continued to Kansat, a place near the India-Bangladesh border, close to the Farakka barrage.

Bhashani's Farakka Long March was the first popular movement against India by Bangladeshi people who demanded a rightful distribution of the Ganges' water. Since then the Farakka Long March Day has been observed on 16 March every year in Bangladesh.

Political philosophy

In the early 1950s he felt that an integrated Pakistan was no longer maintainable due to the hegemony of West Pakistan. At the Kagmari Conference, he bade farewell to West Pakistan by saying Assalamu Alaikum which soon became a reference quote. He declined to participate in the national election of 1970 saying that it would only help perpetuate rule by West Pakistan. From 1969 his favourite slogans were Swadhin Bangla Zindabad and Azad Bangla Zindabad. His dream of an independent Purba Bangla (East Bengal) came true when Bangladesh was established as an independent nation-state in 1971. He advocated for the separation of State and religion. He was a pious Muslim who was in favour of socialism. He spoke out against Bangladesh Jamaat-e-Islami and its politics.

Journalism

The Daily Ittefaq has been the most popular Bengali newspaper of Bangladesh since the early 1970s. However, its precursor was the Weekly Ittefaq. After the British left South Asia in 1947, the Muslim League emerged as the governing political party. Soon opposition movements started and a political party named Awami Muslim League was founded with Bhashani as one of the central figures. Against this backdrop Bhashani and Yar Mohammad Khan started publishing the Weekly Ittefaq in 1949. The popular weekly publication was a critique of the Muslim League government. The journalist Tofazzal Hossain Manik Miah worked as its editor. Manik Miah took over the paper as its editor and publisher from 14 August 1951.

On 25 February 1972, Bhashani started publishing a weekly Haq Katha and it soon achieved wide circulation. It was outspoken about the irregularities and misrule of Awami League government established after independence of Bangladesh. It was a pro-Chinese and socialist weekly. It was edited by Irfanul Bari, Bhashani's subordinate. The weekly was subsequently banned by Sheikh Mujib.

Death
Bhashani died on 17 November 1976 in Dhaka, Bangladesh, aged 96, and was buried at Santosh, Tangail.

Legacy
Bhashani is regarded as the proponent of anti-imperialist, non-communal and left-leaning politics by his admirers in present-day Bangladesh and beyond. In 2013, the Awami League Government of Bangladesh reduced his presence in school curricula. In 2004, Bhashani was ranked number 8 in BBC's poll of the Greatest Bengali of all time.

References

External links

 Bhasani — Reminiscence of a missing mountain, poem by Al Mahmud

1880 births
1976 deaths
People from Tangail District
People from Dhaka
Bangladeshi Muslims
Sunni Muslims
20th-century Bengalis
Awami League politicians
Recipients of the Independence Day Award
Pakistan Movement activists from Bengal
National Awami Party politicians
All India Muslim League members
Presidents of the Awami League
Assam MLAs 1937–1946
Pakistani MNAs 1955–1958
Bangladeshi political party founders
Muslim socialists
Bengali Muslim scholars of Islam